Patricia Donoho Hughes (August 18, 1930 – January 20, 2010) was a First Lady of Maryland, married to former Maryland Governor Harry Hughes. She was educated at Sorbonne (1949) and Bryn Mawr College (1951). She and Hughes eloped on February 7, 1950, and got a marriage licence in Prince George's county before officially getting married on June 30, 1951. She later continued her education at the University of Delaware (1966). Mrs. Hughes was a teacher and educator by profession.

While serving as first lady in the 1980s, she worked to restore Government House, the governor's mansion.

Family
The Hughes family lived in Denton, Maryland, and have two daughters, Ann and Elizabeth.

Death
Hughes died on January 20, 2010, in Denton, aged 79, after 16 years of battling Parkinson's disease.

References

1930 births
2010 deaths
University of Paris alumni
Bryn Mawr College alumni
Neurological disease deaths in Maryland
Deaths from Parkinson's disease
First Ladies and Gentlemen of Maryland
People from Denton, Maryland
University of Delaware alumni
Women in Maryland politics
20th-century American women
21st-century American women